Dominick McCaffrey (born September 24, 1863 in Pittsburgh, Pennsylvania – December 29, 1926) was an Irish-American boxer.

McCaffrey was a popular boxer during his time, often noted for fighting much larger heavyweights. In 1885 he lost the Heavyweight Championship to John L. Sullivan. Following retirement, McCaffrey became the boxing instructor at the Manhattan Athletic Club in New York, New York. McCaffrey was managed by Billy O'Brien, a well known sports authority and one time pugilist in his own right

See also
List of bare-knuckle boxers

References

External links

McCaffrey's Record at Cyber Boxing Zone
1884 Newspaper Clipping

1863 births
1926 deaths
American male boxers
American people of Irish descent
Bare-knuckle boxers
Sportspeople from Pennsylvania
Middleweight boxers